Andrew Byerly Birge is a former United States attorney for the Western District of Michigan. Birge was appointed U.S. attorney by the U.S. District Court for the Western District of Michigan on March 16, 2018. and served until his successor, Mark Totten, was sworn in on May 5, 2022.

References 

United States Attorneys for the Western District of Michigan
Michigan Attorneys General
Year of birth missing (living people)
Living people